Post and Telegraph Department may refer to:

 India Posts
 New Zealand Post Office